The 1925–26 season was Chelsea Football Club's seventeenth competitive season.

Table

References

External links
 1925–26 season at stamford-bridge.com

1925–26
English football clubs 1925–26 season